Pitcairnia lyman-smithiana is a plant species in the genus Pitcairnia. This species is native to Costa Rica.

References

lyman-smithiana
Flora of Costa Rica